Li Wei (born August 1953) is a Chinese politician who served as director of the Development Research Center of the State Council between 2011 and 2019.

He was a member of the 18th Central Committee of the Chinese Communist Party and a representative of the 19th National Congress of the Chinese Communist Party. He was a member of the Standing Committee of the 13th Chinese People's Political Consultative Conference.

Biography
Li was born in Feng County, Jiangsu, in August 1953. He graduated from Shanghai Television University (now Shanghai Open University) and the Central Party School of the Chinese Communist Party. During the Down to the Countryside Movement, he became a sent-down youth in March 1969, and soon joined the People's Liberation Army (PLA) in December 1970. Beginning in April 1976, he served in several posts in Shanghai Chemical Import and Export Corporation, including clerk, deputy section chief, secretary of the Communist Youth League of China.

Li joined the Chinese Communist Party (CCP) in April 1973, and got involved in politics in January 1985, when he was appointed an official in the Economic Cadre Division of Organization Department of CCP Shanghai Municipal Committee. Three years later, he became secretary of the General Office of Shanghai Municipal People's Government and CPC Shanghai Municipal Committee.

In April 1991, he was transferred to Beijing and appointed secretary of the General Office of the State Council. He was chosen as vice president of the China Banking Regulatory Commission in March 2003, a post he kept until October 2005, when he was named deputy director and deputy party secretary of the State-owned Assets Supervision and Administration Commission of the State Council. He served as deputy director of the Development Research Center of the State Council in July 2010, and nine months later was promoted to the director position. In March 2008, he took office as chairperson of the Population, Resources and Environment Committee of the Chinese People's Political Consultative Conference. On 29 May 2019, he stepped down as director of the Development Research Center of the State Council.

References

1953 births
Living people
People from Feng County, Jiangsu
Shanghai Open University alumni
Central Party School of the Chinese Communist Party alumni
People's Republic of China politicians from Jiangsu
Chinese Communist Party politicians from Jiangsu
Members of the 18th Central Committee of the Chinese Communist Party
Members of the Standing Committee of the 13th Chinese People's Political Consultative Conference